GTaranaki, also known as G-TARanaki, was New Zealand's first international guitar festival held in New Plymouth, Taranaki, New Zealand annually from July 2008. The week-long festival brings some of worlds best guitarists to Taranaki to perform, educate and inspire Kiwi guitarists and music fans around New Zealand. G-TARanaki features a celebration of all things guitar with guitarists and bands from a range of genres including Rock, Funk, Classical, Jazz, Blues and Metal.

2008

 Joe Satriani
 Uli Jon Roth
 Gray Bartlett
 Gilby Clarke
 Alex Skolnick Trio
 World War Four
 Glenn Hughes
 Vernon Reid
 Tim Donahue
 Brian Hatcher Band

The event was launched by an auction to benefit the cancer society. Items auctioned included guitars autographed by Pink Floyd, Bon Jovi, AC/DC and U2.

Guitar clinics and discussion forums were held throughout the week. Special midnight sessions included performances from Vernon Reid, from Living Colour, and Gilby Clarke, from Guns N' Roses, who were also joined by major artists on the bill such as Alex Skolnick (Testament / Alex Skolnick Trio) and Uli Jon Roth (Ex-Scorpions). These midnight sessions were held at Puke Ariki. Sky Academy, the music school founded by Uli Jon Roth, offered tuition classes at three Taranaki towns, Waitara, Inglewood and Ōpunake and included guests Vernon Reid and Gilby Clarke. Classical and Jazz performances were given by the New Zealand School of Music led by Matthew Marshall and Nick Granville.

There were a number of firsts for G-TARanaki. Uli Jon Roth performed songs from his album 'Under A Dark Sky' for the first time live. Glenn Hughes performed with a one off New Zealand band, involving guitarist Kara Gordon plus 8Forty8 band members Simon Koretz and drummer Nathan Koretz. Vernon Reid also played with a unique band comprising Jonathan Crayford on keyboards, Magesh Magesh on drums and Crete Haami on bass. Local vocalist Aidan Morrell also joined them for Living Colour hit 'Middle Man'

Paul Martin, DJ for New Zealand's longest standing Metal radio show 'The Axe Attack' performed with his band World War Four and was also MC for much of the G-TARanaki event.

New Zealand artists performing included False Start, Kara Gordon, Swap Gomez, Jamie Anderson, Frank John, Burt Ropiha, Bryce Wastney, Ross Townsend, Stephanie Piqette, Karl Austin, Nathan Annand, Brandon Reihana of Blindspott, Ross Halliday, Diarmuid Cahill, Adrian Whelan, New Plymouth Ukulele Orchestra, The Smiles, Dave Ritchie Smith, Craig Radford, Joel Haines, Matt Herrett and Ash & Aidan.

The second G-TARanaki festival is to be held in New Plymouth between 11–15 August 2010.

Band Line Ups (2008)

2009

The 2009 event was held between 28 September and 4 October at Puke Ariki and TSB Stadium.

Band Line-ups (2009)

Band Line-ups for 2009 UNKNOWN

2010

The 2010 G-Taranaki line-up will consist of:

Slash
Uli Jon Roth
Jennifer Batten
Tony Levin
Vinnie Moore
Hail!
Guy Pratt
The Checks
California Guitar Trio
Oli Brown Band
Desireé Bassett
Shotgun Alley
In Dread Response
the Thomas Oliver Band
Blue Monkey Racket
Fall Within

-Legendary guitarist Leslie West was removed from the line-up due to health reasons.

-the festival dates are 11 to 15 August, at the Puke Ariki and TSB Stadium in New Plymouth

Band Line-ups (2010)

See also
 New Zealand music festivals

External links
 G-TARanaki Official website
 G-TARanaki photography by Tahnia Roberts
 G-TARanaki photography by Emily McCarvill

New Plymouth
2008 in New Zealand
Music festivals in New Zealand
2008 in music
Music festivals established in 2008
Classical music festivals in New Zealand
Annual events in New Zealand